James Donald Martin (February 7, 1920 – September 30, 1997) was an American professional basketball player. He played for the Basketball Association of America's St. Louis Bombers and Baltimore Bullets between 1946 and 1949, averaging 3.0 points per game for his career.

Following his college career, Martin obtained a master's degree from Iowa State University. He then became a teacher and basketball coach, first at Effingham High School, then at Central Junior High School in Belleville, Illinois, retiring in 1983.

BAA career statistics

Regular season

Playoffs

References

External links

1920 births
1997 deaths
American men's basketball players
Baltimore Bullets (1944–1954) players
Basketball players from Missouri
Centers (basketball)
Central Missouri Mules basketball players
Forwards (basketball)
High school basketball coaches in Illinois
Iowa State University alumni
People from Poplar Bluff, Missouri
St. Louis Bombers (NBA) players